Podsmead is a district of Gloucester approximately one mile from the historic city centre. With the development of Quedgeley and Kingsway Village, Podsmead was becoming absorbed by the city in the early 21st century. The population of this Gloucester Ward was 2,994 at the 2011 Census. It is close to the hamlet of Hempsted.

History
Podsmead was largely built during the 20th century. The larger, grander houses similar to those in parts of Tuffley were built in the interwar period whilst immediately after World War II an estate of temporary homes and social housing was built. Some of the temporary housing is still in use. Podsmead has a large council estate.

In 1943 the Crypt School moved to its present home in Podsmead.

References

Areas of Gloucester